Ignacio González may refer to:

Footballers 
 Ignacio González (footballer, born 1944), Guatemalan goalkeeper
 Nacho González (footballer, born 1971), Argentine goalkeeper
 Nacho González (footballer, born 1982), Uruguayan midfielder
 Ignacio González (footballer, born 1983), Uruguayan centre-back
 Ignacio González (footballer, born 1984), Mexican defender
 Ignacio González (footballer, born 1989), Chilean goalkeeper
 Ignacio González (footballer, born 1991), Mexican right-back
 Ignacio González (footballer, born 1993), Uruguyan football winger

Others 
 Ignacio González González (born 1960), Spanish politician
 Ignacio González (fencer), Cuban foil fencer on the 1995 & 1997 World Fencing Championships
 Ignacio Jordà González (born 1973), pornographic actor known by his stage name Nacho Vidal
 Ignacio González King (born 1980), Argentinian tennis player
 Ignacio González (artist) (born 1973), Mexican drummer, a member of rock&roll band Cuca
 Ignacio María González (politician) (1838–1915), politician from the Dominican Republic